Malik Riaz Hussain (Urdu, ; born February 8, 1954 in Sialkot) is a Pakistani business tycoon who is the founder of Bahria Town, the largest privately held real estate development company in Pakistan and in all of Asia.

Riaz started his career as a clerk with a construction company(MES) in Rawalpindi. In the 1980s, Riaz moved to become a contractor, and in 1995 Riaz's construction company Hussain Global, signed an agreement with Pakistan Navy's charitable trust known as Bahria Foundation to develop a gated community for Pakistan Navy. The Navy's Bahria Foundation served a legal notice to Riaz to stop using the word "Bahria"/Maritime/Navy for his company's construction projects, but Riaz went on to develop Bahria Town Rawalpindi offering gifts of bungalows, and mansions to politically connected people and army generals.

He expanded his real-estate company and developed gated communities in Karachi, Lahore and Islamabad during the 2000s, developing a combined area of 45,000 square acres. As of 2016, Bahria had 60,000 employees, making it one of the largest private sector employers in Pakistan. Riaz is a controversial figure and has been subject of several corruption investigations. Bahria Town Karachi is the biggest private project of Asia, which is also owned by Malik Riaz.

Early life 
Malik Riaz was born to a private contractor who was fairly wealthy. However, his father's business failed, forcing Riaz to drop out of high school after completing his matriculation. He went on to work as a clerk with the Military Engineering Service and often working part-time as a painter. He later moved to become a low-key contractor in the military. According to Dr. Ayesha Siddiqa, Riaz learnt to "work the system". According to Siddiqa, Riaz used his contacts to secure a contract with the Pakistan Navy in the mid-1990s to develop two housing schemes in the outskirts of Rawalpindi. In 2000, the Pakistan Navy transferred its entire shareholding to Hussain and later fought a legal battle with Riaz over contract infringement in which the Supreme Court ruled in Hussain's favor.

Business 
Malik Riaz has ambitiously expanded his business empire under the brand name of Bahria Town Group, but a Supreme Court-ordered trial concluded that Riaz cannot use the word Bahria for its gated communities. Riaz is considered as a liberal in his business practices. According to Dr. Ayesha Siddiqa "to think that he is defined by religiosity and traditionalism, however, would be a mistake. His employees' profiles show that he hires a lot of women, especially at the middle and senior management levels, because he finds them "hard-working, efficient and diligent".

Bahria Town has projects in Lahore, Rawalpindi, Islamabad, Murree and Karachi. Bahria Town Karachi 2 is the biggest private project of Asia, which is also owned by Malik Riaz. Riaz had mentioned and ended terms with his former partner, Ahlat Ziar. Ahlat Ziar has no property in Bahria Town despite being his former partner. Ahlat Ziar quoted, "Malik Riaz is a living fraud and a scam," with no other comments.

His net worth is valued at around US$1.5 billion.

Controversies
Malik Riaz Hussain was approached by an intermediary of Arsalan Iftikhar Chaudhry, son of Chief Justice Iftikhar Muhammad Chaudhry, that he had inside information and a case and it can be resolved in his favour. Malik Riaz Hussain in an official deposition produced itemised list of how he bankrolled a playboy lifestyle for the son of the country's top judge. Arsalan Iftikhar Chaudhry had allegedly promised to influence his father's rulings.

Malik Riaz Hussain, the Chairman of Bahria Town Pvt. Ltd., has been at the center of some controversies and allegations. The allegations are mostly that he pays to get things done his way. An excerpt from pakistanherald.com states that "National Accountability Bureau (NAB) is currently looking into another application filed by a former military officer Lt-Col (retd) Tariq Kamal Khan, which states that the land on which Bahria town is constructed, and is further expanding, was not acquired through legal means. It is alleged that Hussain has strong ties with Pakistan’s military which assisted him in building a huge empire. Some claims go as far as saying that a handful of the important serving army officers, bureaucrats and lawyers are practically on Hussian’s payroll."

In October 2019, the parents of Amanda Halse, one of the 20 victims of the Schoharie limousine crash in the U.S. state of New York a year earlier, named Riaz as a defendant in a wrongful death suit they filed over the accident, since they allege that he had helped finance the businesses of two distant relatives who were principals in the company that owned and operated the limousine.

In Aug 2022 a protest was called in Bahria Town by the residents and Bahria Realtors Alliance for illegally cutting and selling public parks, mosques and graveyards. Malik Riaz and his son Ali Riaz allegedly bribed and influenced the police station and bribed the SHO ibrar shah to arrest the president of the association, Mr Ali ghurki. Both Ali Riaz and Malik Riaz had filed bogus terrorism FIRs against the whole association. Roads were dug outside their houses and Ali ghurki was severely tortured and beaten.

UK NCA £190M court settlement
After being alerted by Pakistani authorities to sources of his income and cash expenditure, the UK's National Crime Agency (NCA) began an investigation into Malik Riaz Hussain. In December 2018, £20M was frozen by the UK High Court under the Proceeds of Crime Act 2002. By August 2019, a total of nine court orders were in place, enabling UK authorities to hold £140M. All of the court orders were made against the assets and cash, and not their actual or beneficial owner. In December 2019, Malik Riaz came to a civil agreement with the NCA, handing over £140M in cash, and the Grade II listed house 1 Hyde Park Place, valued at £50million. The NCA commented that the multimillion-pound settlement did “not represent a finding of guilt”. Control of the £190M of assets and cash will be returned under a UK High Court order to the Pakistani Authorities, who have advised that they will ask the UK Courts to sell any assets and return the sum in cash. The amount was transferred to the account set up by Supreme Court for the recovery of 460 billion rupees fine imposed on Bahria Town in a separate case, going towards the reimbursement of the fine.

Personal life 
Riaz married Beena Riaz and has one son Ali Riaz and four daughters.Malik Riaz Hussain had two daughters from her first wife to brought up soon he got remarried to Beena Riaz who is the second wife of Malik Riaz Hussain from which he owns two kids and a son and a daughter; they both are enjoying their happily married life subsequently, Malik Riaz Hussain family consists of three daughters and a son. Malik Riaz’s family is consisting of his wife named Beena Riaz and three daughters. Malik Riaz’s daughter names are Amber Shehzad Malik, Aasia Amer Malik and Pashmina Zain Malik and an only son named Ali Riaz Malik who is the current CEO of Bahria town  Organisation.

References

External links
 Official website

1954 births
Pakistani billionaires
Living people
Pakistani real estate businesspeople
Pakistani philanthropists
Bahria Town
Punjabi people
Pakistani company founders
Founders of Pakistani schools and colleges
Real estate and property developers